Celta de Vigo participated in La Liga, Copa del Rey and the UEFA Cup in the 2002-03 season, for the first time qualifying for the UEFA Champions League, thanks to a fourth-placed finish in La Liga. This was the crown of the work former coach Víctor Fernández had put in to establish Celta as a credible force, and it was under Miguel Ángel Lotina's leadership the club reached the ultimate level of the "Euro Celta" era.

Squad

Left club during season

Competitions

La Liga

League table

Matches

External links
   FootballSquads - Celta Vigo 2002-03

RC Celta de Vigo seasons
Celta